Dutil is a French toponymic surname. Notable people with the surname include:

 Grégory Dutil (born 1980), French professional footballer
 Marcel Dutil (born 1942), Canadian businessman
  (born 1944), Quebecer actress
 Robert Dutil (born 1950), Canadian businessman and politician
 Yvan Dutil (born 1970), Canadian astrophysicist

See also

References 

Surnames of French origin